Quebec City Film Festival (FCVQ or QCFF) is a film festival held annually in September in Quebec City, Quebec, Canada. It screens short and feature films and premieres movies from all over the world.

Description 
Founded in 2011, the Quebec City Film Festival (QCFF) is a non-profit organization that strives to offer film enthusiasts from Quebec and visitors from outside the province and abroad a major film event similar to other iconic international film festivals. It is a renowned and recognised platform that screens regional and international productions of new and original films. The QCFF also supports local and regional emerging artists by providing them with a showcase to present their works that attracts major media exposure.

History 
Since its inception, every year in the month of September the QCFF presents about 50 international feature films and more than 100 short films. The films represent all cinematographic genres and perspectives from all over the world, attracting an audience of more than 25,000 festival visitors every year. In addition to these works come the artisans that create them. At past events, the QCFF was proud to welcome more than 300 special guests to the festival, including well known filmmakers Jean-Claude Labrecque, Xavier Dolan, Jean-Marc Vallée, Denys Arcand, Christophe Gans, Mike Figgis, and Larry Clark as well as the many actors, writers and producers who also accompany their works at the festival.

The festival was not staged in 2021, due to the COVID-19 pandemic in Quebec, but returned in 2022 with a smaller program than usual.

2011 
 21 September – 2 October
 122 films
 80 special guests
 10 387 festival visitors
For its first edition, the QCFF opened with film Jean-Marc Vallée’s film Café de Flore, which was attended by the film's team; The Happiness of Others (Le bonheur des autres), the feature debut by Jean-Philippe Pearson, closed the festival.

2012 

 13 – 23 September
 155 films
 75 special guests
 24 421 festival visitors
Based on a true story, L'Affaire Dumont was presented as the opening film of the second edition of the QCFF and attended by director Podz, producer Nicole Robert and actors that appeared in the film. Filmmaker Anaïs Barbeau-Lavalette's Inch'Allah was chosen to close the second festival.

Festival activities were centred around the Dôme (aka the Igloo) in Place d’Youville and became a distinctive feature of the festival. It was open free to the public and hosted several evening parties and VIP events.

2013 

 18 – 29 September
 161 films
 88 special guests
 25 464 festival visitors
For its third edition, Parkland by Peter Landesman, an ensemble film based around the assassination of JFK, was presented to open the festival. The Quebec premiere of Stefan Miljevic’s film Amsterdam was chosen to close the festival.

New for the third year: the creation of the Cinephile Jury, made up entirely of residents of Québec City. The jury awards the most original film among first-time filmmakers. In 2013, the award went to Don Jon, the debut by American actor Joseph Gordon-Levitt.

2014 

 18 – 28 September
 161 films
105 special guests
 23 191 festival visitors
Mommy by Xavier Dolan was presented as the opening film and attended by the film's team. The North American premiere of Beauty and the Beast was screened at the awards ceremony and attended by the film's writer and director Christophe Gans.

The usual closing ceremony, which had been held on the last Saturday, is from then on replaced by a gala on the second Wednesday, during which the award ceremony takes place.

Shortly before the festival began, containers were remodelled as mini cinema halls named Ciné Pop-up. A roaming project, they are placed in different locations throughout Québec City. The goal of Ciné Pop-up is to relocate screenings to where residents live so that they can view a selection of short films in their neighbourhoods.

2015

 16 – 27 September
 217 films
208 special guests
 24 839 festival visitors

Paul à Québec by François Bouvier was presented as the opening film: author Michel Rabagliati, producer Karine Vanasse and actors from the film descended on the red carpet of Place d’Youville for the occasion. Philippe Falardeau's film My Internship in Canada was screened at the awards ceremony.

The concert film The Phantom of the Opera (a screening of the Rupert Julian classic from 1925 set to music by an orchestra conducted by Gabriel Thibaudeau) was presented at the Palais Montcalm and featured a Casavant organ.

Ciné Pop-up continued to relocate throughout the city as Place d'Youville was transformed into a large open-air cinema, with screenings that included, among others, the Back to the Future trilogy to coincide with the 30th anniversary of the release of the first film.

2016
 14 – 24 September
 204 special guests
 294 films
 over 30 000 festival visitors
For its sixth edition, the festival opened with Boundaries (French title: Pays) by Chloé Robichaud, with some members of the film's crew attending. Along with the director, actors such as Rémy Girard, Yves Jacques, Macha Grenon, and Emily Van Camp, as well as Quebec cinema artists like Julien Poulin, Marie Eykel, Manon Briand and Rock Demers walked up the red carpet of place D’Youville.

The Palais Montcalm also hosted the North-American premiere of 1:54 by Yan England, screened as the film of the Award ceremony night. The features It's only the End of the World (French title: Juste la fin du monde) by Xavier Dolan and Kiss me like a Lover (French title: Embrasse-moi comme tu m’aimes) by André Forcier, both premiered at the festival and were favorites among the audience, the latter winning the Public's Choice Award for a Feature Film.

For a third year in a row, the Ciné Pop-up also spread around downtown, both before and during the festival, becoming over the years a classic and must-see event.

2017 
 13 – 23 September
 253 special guests
 291 films
 over 45 000 festival visitors

For its 2017 edition, the Festival opened with the world premiere of Cross My Heart, directed by Luc Picard. The filmmaker and members of the casr were in attendance. Barefoot At Dawn by Francis Leclerc screened as the Gala Night Film, and was preceded by the awards ceremony : cast members Roy Dupuis, Justin Leyrolles-Bouchard, Robert Lepage and Marianne Fortier were attending.

Two Film Concerts were hosted at Palais Montcalm. The Passion of Joan of Arc, Dreyer's silent masterpiece of 1928, eas interpreted by the pianist and organist Karol Mossakowski. QCFF also screened Oscar-winning BiRDMAN by Alejandro González Iñárritu, with the soundtrack performed live by its composer, drummer Antonio Sánchez.

Various cultural personalities attended the Festival: Louise Lecavalier, Marc Séguin, Zachary Richard, Cédric Klapisch, and others.

Tributes 
 2017: George Lazenby
 2016 : Julien Poulin & Rock Demers
 2015 : Denys Arcand & Matthew Rankin
 2014 : Richard Lavoie, Bruce LaBruce et Alain Resnais
 2013 : Izabel Grondin & Im Sang-Soo
 2012 : Alex Gibney
 2011 : Jean-Claude Labrècque & Larry Clark

Spokespersons 
 2015 : François Létourneau
 2014 : Yves Jacques

Venues 
Mostly displayed in the historical centre of Québec City, QCFF made screenings in the following places :

Awards

Grand Prize

Public Award, Feature Film

Public Award, Canadian Film

Best First Film (Prix Jury Cinéphile/AQCC Award)

Collegiate Jury Award

Grand Jury Prize, Canadian Short Film

Grand Jury Prize, International Short Film

Public Prize, Short Film

Local Talent Award (Bourse à la créations des cinéastes de Québec)

References

Film festivals in Quebec
Festivals in Quebec City
Film festivals established in 2011
2011 establishments in Quebec